The College of Arts and Science (CAS) is one of the five-degree-granting units of the Mapúa Malayan Colleges Laguna. The CAS, as the intellectual core of any academic institution, lay down the foundations of a well-balanced education in the humanities, social sciences, mathematics and the natural sciences.

Degree Program
In 2009, the College of Arts and Science started the Bachelor of Arts in Communication, Major in Multimedia Arts – MCL's first liberal arts program and the first of its kind in the country.

The program is a fusion of the study of varied communication structures and contexts, and its application to the utilization of new media technologies, or the electronic media.

In 2018, the College of Arts and Sciences introduced Bachelor of Arts in Communication, with three tracks to choose from: political communication; creative and performing arts; and new media. 

In 2020, the said college paved the way to commence a new program, Bachelor of Science in Psychology.

References
Mapúa Malayan Colleges Laguna
MCL College of Arts and Science

External links
Mapúa Institute of Technology

2009 establishments in the Philippines
Universities and colleges in Laguna (province)
Education in Cabuyao
Mapúa University